The portmanteau term clayography is a term created by Academy Award-winning animator Adam Elliot. Elliot struggled with ways of describing his unique animation technique and so created this word to aptly express his artistic style.

Meaning
A combination of the words clay and biography, the term is similar to another portmanteau term "Claymation" which is a registered trademark in the United States, registered by Will Vinton in 1978 to describe his clay-animated films. Clay is often used as a general term for plasticine in the stop motion animation community. As Elliot's films explore the details of real people's lives and are the basis of all his animated films, the words biography and biographical are suitable words to use in describing his work. Each of his films is a Clayography (singular) and as a body of work they are Clayographies (plural).

See also
Mary and Max
 Harvie Krumpet

External links
 Adam Elliot official website
 
 Mary and Max official site
 Adam Elliot's Full Biography
 Olivier Cotte (2007) Secrets of Oscar-winning animation: Behind the scenes of 13 classic short animations. (Making of '"Harvie Krumpet"'') Focal Press. 

Animation techniques
Clay animation films